Papilio fuscus, the Canopus swallowtail, is a butterfly of the family Papilionidae, that is found on Timor, northern Australia, and New Guinea.

The wingspan is about 80 mm.

The larvae feed on Rutaceae species.

Subspecies

P. f. fuscus (Buru, Ambon, Serang)
P. f. alorensis  Rothschild, 1894 (Alor)
P. f. beccarii  Oberthür, 1880 (western Irian, north-western New Guinea)
P. f. canopinus  Rothschild, 1895 (Romang, Leti Islands)
P. f. canopus  Westwood, 1842 (north-western Australia, Northern Territory)
P. f. capaneus  Westwood, 1843 (Cape York to northern New South Wales)
P. f. cilix  Godman & Salvin, 1879 (New Hanover, New Ireland)
P. f. croton  Fruhstorfer, 1904 (Damar)
P. f. hasterti  Ribbe, 1907 (Bougainville, Choiseul)
P. f. hypsicles  Hewitson, 1868 (New Hebrides)
P. f. hypsiclides  Rothschild, 1894 (Wetar)
P. f. indicatus  Butler, 1876 (southern New Guinea, Papua New Guinea, D'Entrecasteaux, Woodlark, Lousiades, Torres Straits Islands)
P. f. lamponius  Fruhstorfer, 1904 (New Britain)
P. f. lapathus  Fruhstorfer, 1904 (Morotai, Halmahera, Ternate, Bachan)
P. f. lunifer  Rothschild, 1895 (Talaud, Sangie Islands)
P. f. metagenes  Fruhstorfer, 1904 (Tukangbesi: Binongko)
P. f. minor  Oberthür, 1879 (northern Sulawesi, Sangihe)
P. f. ombiranus  Rothschild, 1898 (Obi)
P. f. pertinax  Wallace, 1865 (Sulawesi, Tukangbesi, Salaya, Sula Islands)
P. f. porrothenus  Jordan, 1909 (Tanadjampea, Kalao, south-western Sulawesi)
P. f. rotalita  (Swinhoe, 1893) (Aru, Key)
P. f. talyabona  Joicey & Talbot, 1932 (Sula)
P. f. tenimberensis  Rothschild, 1896 (Tanimbar, Babar)
P. f. thomsoni  Butler, 1884 (Kai Islands)
P. f. umbrosus  Rothschild, 1894 (Sambawa)
P. f. vollenhovii  C. & R. Felder, 1865 (Timor)
P. f. wasiensis  Hanafusa, 1991 (Tukangbesi: Wangiwangi)
P. f. xenophilus  Mathew, 1886 (Guadalcanal, Santa Isabel, New Georgia Group)

Taxonomy
Papilio fuscus  is the nominate member of the fuscus species group. The members of this clade are:
 Papilio albinus Wallace, 1865
 Papilio diophantus Grose-Smith, 1883
 Papilio fuscus Goeze, 1779
 Papilio hipponous C. & R. Felder, 1862
 Papilio jordani Fruhstorfer, 1906
 Papilio pitmani Elwes & de Nicéville, [1887]
 Papilio prexaspes C. & R. Felder, 1865
 Papilio sakontala Hewitson, 1864

External links
 Australian caterpillars−larvae: Papilio fuscus
 CSIRO.au: insect names

fuscus
Butterflies of Oceania
Butterflies of Australia
Butterflies of Indonesia
Lepidoptera of New Guinea
Lepidoptera of Papua New Guinea
Insects of Timor
Butterflies described in 1779